Lea Springs is an unincorporated community in southwestern Grainger County, Tennessee. It is located 2 miles northeast of the city of Blaine. It is also located partially inside Blaine's city limits and urban growth boundary.

History 
Lea Springs is the site of a historic mansion of the same name. It was built by slaves in 1819 for Pryor Lea, who grew up in nearby Richland. Lea became a politician in Tennessee and Texas, and he was a founding trustee of the University of Mississippi. He died in 1879, and the house was remodeled as a resort in the 1880s.

The mansion was designed in the Federal architectural style, and has been listed on the National Register of Historic Places.

References

Unincorporated communities in Grainger County, Tennessee
Unincorporated communities in Tennessee